is a Japanese manga series written and illustrated by TAa. The series has been serialized on Kadokawa Shoten's Young Ace Up website since January 26, 2016, and has been collected in eight tankōbon volumes as of August 26, 2022. The manga is licensed in North America by Denpa. They released its first English volume on March 13, 2019. It is a spin-off of Type-Moon's Fate/stay night series, set in an alternate universe where the Fifth Holy Grail War resolved with most of the characters surviving and later becoming friends and neighbours. The series revolves around the protagonist Shirō Emiya's daily life cooking various types of Japanese cuisine for his family and friends. A thirteen-episode original net animation adaptation by Ufotable aired monthly from January 25, 2018, to January 1, 2019.

Synopsis

The story takes place in an alternate universe resembling Fate/hollow ataraxia where Shirō Emiya lives peacefully with his family and friends in Fuyuki City. It focuses on Shirō Emiya cooking various types of Japanese cuisine for his family and friends throughout the year's four seasons.

Media

Manga
Today's Menu for the Emiya Family, written and illustrated by TAa, began serialisation on Kadokawa Shoten's Young Ace Up website since January 26, 2016. Eight tankōbon volumes have been released as of August 26, 2022. A special edition of volume 6 including a recipe book was also released alongside the standard volume. North American manga publishing company Denpa has licensed the series and released the first English print volume on March 12, 2019. The manga has also been licensed in Taiwan and Thailand.

Volume list

Anime
An original net animation adaptation premiered during the Fate Project New Year's Eve TV Special on December 31, 2017. The anime began streaming in Japan on February 1, 2018, with each episode premiering on the first of every month. It is produced by Ufotable, which had previously worked with Type-Moon on the majority of the Fate/stay night anime adaptations. The anime is directed by Takahiro Miura and Tetsuto Satō, produced by Hikaru Kondo, and written by the Ufotable staff. Toko Uchimura designed the characters, and Go Shiina composed the music. The opening theme song is "Apron Boy" by DJ Misoshiru & MC Gohan, and the ending theme song is "Collage" by Sangatsu no Phantasia. The anime is licensed in North America by Aniplex of America and began streaming on Crunchyroll on January 25, 2018. The series ran for 13 episodes.

Episode list

Video game
A video game adaptation of the manga, titled  is published by Aniplex for the Nintendo Switch as a download-only title. The game was meant to be released in May 2020 until it was delayed to April 28, 2021, due to the COVID-19 pandemic. Aniplex later announced the game would get a North American release, which occurred on June 2, 2021.

Notes

References

External links
  
  
  
 

Seinen manga
2018 anime ONAs
Anime series based on manga
Aniplex
Comedy anime and manga
Cooking in anime and manga
Cooking video games
Fate/stay night anime
Fate/stay night manga
Kadokawa Dwango franchises
Kadokawa Shoten manga
2021 video games
Nintendo Switch games
Nintendo Switch-only games
Slice of life anime and manga
Type-Moon
Ufotable
Video games postponed due to the COVID-19 pandemic